Hamburg Cemetery is the main cemetery of Hamburg, Ashley County, Arkansas.  It is located on the east side of the city, south of Arkansas Highway 8 (East Parker Street).  Hamburg was established in 1848, and the first burial was recorded in the cemetery in 1859.  It has since become the burial site for many of Hamburg's leading citizens.

The oldest section of the cemetery, which was used predominantly from its inception to 1950, was listed on the National Register of Historic Places (as "Hamburg Cemetery, Historic Section") in 2011.

Notable burials
 Charles Portis (1933–2020), author of True Grit

See also
 National Register of Historic Places listings in Ashley County, Arkansas

References

External links
 

Cemeteries on the National Register of Historic Places in Arkansas
National Register of Historic Places in Ashley County, Arkansas
1859 establishments in Arkansas
Cemetery
Cemeteries established in the 1850s